Charles René de Paul de Saint-Marceaux (23 September 1845 – 23 April 1915) was a French sculptor.

Biography
He was born in Reims and at age eighteen went to Paris to study at the École des Beaux-Arts. A student of François Jouffroy, he became primarily a sculptor of portrait busts and animals. He exhibited at the Paris salon from 1868, when, passing up the competition for the Prix de Rome, he decided to spend time in Florence instead. He passed a second sojourn in Italy in 1873–74. On his return, his marble Génie gardant le secret de la tombe ("Spirit Guarding the Secret of the Tomb"), conserved in the Musée d'Orsay, Paris, shows the marked influence of Michelangelo.

Among his works were several statues created for Baron Rothschild for his Château de Ferrières and the tomb at Montmartre Cemetery in Paris for Alexandre Dumas, fils.

In 1891 René de Saint-Marceaux joined the newly formed Société des artistes français.

Saint-Marceaux was also a medallist, and a collector of Ancient Greek coins. In 1907 he was commissioned to execute the plaquette for the Société française des Amis de la Médaille.

His bronze and granite monument for the headquarters of the Universal Postal Union in Bern, Switzerland (illustration) erected in 1909, represents the five continents as floating figures joined in transmitting messages around the globe. A postage stamp honoring the sculptor and the monument was issued jointly by Switzerland and France in 2009.
 
René de Saint-Marceaux died in Paris in 1915.

Gallery

References

External links

 

1845 births
1915 deaths
Artists from Reims
Members of the Académie des beaux-arts
École des Beaux-Arts alumni
20th-century French sculptors
19th-century French sculptors
French male sculptors
Members of the Ligue de la patrie française
Commandeurs of the Légion d'honneur
19th-century French male artists